The University of Arizona College of Medicine – Phoenix was initially established as a branch campus of University of Arizona College of Medicine in Tucson in 2007, but became an independent medical school in 2012.

History
The College of Medicine at the University of Arizona was founded in Tucson in 1967 with an initial class of 32 students. It has since grown to enroll approximately 120 students annually and has graduated over 4,000 physicians since its inception.

By 1983, Medical students at the University of Arizona College of Medicine were taking required clerkships in the Phoenix area in internal medicine, pediatrics, neurology, obstetrics and gynecology, and family practice, as well as clinical electives.  By 1991 One-third of the University of Arizona College of Medicine students spent a portion of their third year in Phoenix. In 1992, a Phoenix program was officially established to allow the school's 3rd and 4th year medical students to complete clinical clerkships at Phoenix-area hospitals. Then, in 2004, the Arizona Board of Regents approves the expansion of the College to a four-year program, and agreement is reached to lease buildings in the new Phoenix Biomedical Campus (PBC) to the College. On May 20, 2005, Governor Janet Napolitano signs House Bill 2768 appropriating $6 million to the new College.  In 2006, the historic buildings of the former Phoenix Union High School are finished being restored and are opened and dedicated.

In July 2007, the four-year branch campus is formally opened and its inaugural class of 24 students was admitted to begin their studies in August.  The next year, the class size is increased to 48 per year. In 2012, the Liaison Committee on Medical Education (LCME) granted preliminary accreditation to the University of Arizona College of Medicine – Phoenix and the recruitment and admissions processes for the two colleges are now independent. Though the Phoenix campus began as collaboration between the University of Arizona, Arizona State University, and the neighboring Translational Genomics Research Institute, Arizona State University pulled out of the partnership in April 2010, citing state budget cuts. Both colleges, in Tucson and Phoenix, are now solely associated with the University of Arizona.

The Phoenix College graduated its first class of 24 on May 12, 2011. Forty students graduate in 2012, and the number admitted increases to 80 per year. That year, the College received preliminary accreditation to recruit applicants and enroll students to grant medical degrees. As of 2013, the College of Medicine – Phoenix is fully accredited separately from the College of Medicine in Tucson. In that year, 50 students graduated, 37 in 2014, 54 in 2015, 66 in 2016, and 81 in 2017.

References

External links

Medical schools in Arizona
University of Arizona
Educational institutions established in 2007
2007 establishments in Arizona